A Pinwheel Without Wind is a 2002 Chinese romantic drama film directed by Liu Te-kai and starring Zhou Xun and Jeff Chang.

Plot
China 1945, a romance develops between the young Zhao Ningjing (Zhou Xun) and Lin Shuang-Ran (Jeff Chang), although they are distant cousins and Shuang-Ran is already betrothed. Each will seek to fight against there destiny to try to live each their romantic feelings.

Cast
 Zhou Xun as Zhao Ningjing
 Jeff Chang as Lin Shuang-Ran
 Terry Chiu Hsin-Chih as Xiong Ying-Sheng
 Zheng Li as 	Su-yun
 Gong Xibing as Zhao's father
 Xi Meijuan as Madame Zhao
 Zhao Xiaoli

Crew
 Direction by Liu Te Kai
 Storyline by Sharon Chung
 Art direction by Song Jun, Li Bao-Lin
 Cinematography by Zhen Chun-Xiao, Lee Yee-Siu, Zhong Chun-He, Chan Yiu-Ming

Awards

References

External links
 

2002 films
Chinese drama films
2002 drama films
2000s Chinese films